ROKS Hansando (ATH-81) is a helicopter training ship of the Republic of Korea Navy. She is named after Hansando.

Development and design 
On 23 October 2020, Defense Acquisition Program Administration announced that Hyundai Heavy Industries had delivered Hansando to the Republic of Korea Navy. 

She has a length of 142m with width of 25m. Capable of holding a helicopter on her helipad. She carriers a single OTO 76mm, a 40mm gun and MASS decoy launchers. Displacement is about 4,300 tons and has a crew of 150. She runs on both hybrid diesel and electric engines with 2 shafts. Speed of 24 knots and rang of 6,479 nautical mile. She is capable of having a hospital ship role, to be able to accommodate more than 400 people, surgery rooms, lecture rooms, dispensary and sickbeds.

Construction and career 
ROKS Hansando was laid down and launched on 16 November 2018 by Hyundai Heavy Industries and was commissioned on 5 April 2021.

References

2018 ships
Auxiliary ships of the Republic of Korea Navy
Ships built by Hyundai Heavy Industries Group